This is a list of Chinese television series by genre. For a chronological list, see List of Chinese television programs by date.

Modern drama (现代剧)

Action (动作) / Adventure (探险)

The Lost Tomb (2015)
The Mystic Nine (2016)
Candle in the Tomb (2016)

Candle in the Tomb: Mu Ye Gui Shi (2017)
The Golden Eyes (2018)

Comedy (喜剧)

I Love My Family (1993) 
Home with Kids (2005) 
Nonstop (2009)
iPartment (2009)
Surprise (2013)
Mad About You (2016)

Crime (犯罪) / Procedural (侦探) / Suspense (悬疑)

A Sentimental Story (1997)
Monopoly Exposure (2014)
Love Me If You Dare (2015)
Memory Lost (2016)
When a Snail Falls in Love (2016)
Medical Examiner Dr. Qin (2016)
Yu Zui (2016)
Burning Ice (2017)
Day and Night (2017)
Age of Legends (2018)
Love Journey (2019) 
Dancing in the Storm (2019)
Reset (TV series) (2022)

Drama (戏剧) / Family (家庭) / Slice-of-life (生活)Ke Wang (1990) Sinful Debt (1995) Silent Tears (2006) Struggle (2007)Beautiful Life (2007)Thank You for Having Loved Me (2007)My Youthfulness (2009)Stage of Youth (2009)I'm a Boss (2009)The Big Life (2010)Will You Marry Me and My Family (2010)Run Daddy Run (2010)Sinful Debt 2 (2010)Melody of Youth (2011)The Bachelor (2012) Marriage Cuisine (2014)Tiger Mom (2015)Ode to Joy (2016)To Be a Better Man (2016)Housing (2016)In the Name of People (2017)Midnight Diner (2017)The First Half of My Life (2017)Dear My Friends (2017)Mother's Life (2018)All Is Well (2019) The World Between Us (2019) Nothing But Thirty (2020)Go Ahead (2020)

Fantasy (玄幻) / Science fiction (科幻)Magic Touch of Fate (2005)Love Weaves Through a Millennium (2015)My Amazing Boyfriend (2016)The Starry Night, The Starry Sea (2017)Moonshine and Valentine (2018)Sweet Dreams (2018) Lie to Love (2021)

Romance (言情)Old House Has Joy (1998)Love Story in Shanghai (2001)Sky Lovers (2002)Only You (2002) Boy & Girl (2003)Sound of Colors (2006) Emerald on the Roof (2006) Star Boulevard (2006)Paris Sonata (2006)Fast Track Love (2006)Modern Beauty (2007) A Mobile Love Story (2008)The Girl in Blue (2010)Single Princesses and Blind Dates (2010)Sunny Happiness (2011)Symphony of Fate (2011)Sealed with a Kiss (2011)The Queen of SOP (2012)When Love Walked In (2012)Beijing Love Story (2012)Drama Go! Go! Go! (2012)Flowers in Fog (2013)Best Time (2013)Destiny by Love (2013)Fiancee (2013) Boss & Me (2014)Scarlet Heart 2 (2014) Loving, Never Forgetting (2014)Go, Single Lady (2014)Love at Second Sight (2014)My Sunshine (2015)Diamond Lover (2015)Beautiful Secret (2015)Angel Wings (2016)Stay with Me (2016)Pretty Li Hui Zhen (2017)The Fox's Summer (2017)Angelo (2017)Shall I Compare You to a Spring Day (2017)A Seven-Faced Man (2017)Mr. Right (2018)Old Boy (2018)Only Side by Side with You (2018)Here to Heart (2018)Summer's Desire (2018)The Way We Were (2018)My Story for You (2018)All Out of Love (2018)Never Gone (2018) 
’’Shallow Lover’’ (2018)If I Can Love You So (2019) Lucky's First Love (2019)River Flows To You (2019)See You Again (2019)My Girlfriend (2019) Find Yourself (2019)Tears in Heaven (2019)Love is Sweet (2020)My Girl (2020)Sparkle love (2020)Broker (2020)Midsummer Is Full of Hearts (2020)

Sports (运动)The Whirlwind Girl (2015)My Mr. Mermaid (2017)The King's Avatar (2019) The Prince of Tennis (2019)Ping Pong Life (2020)Skate into Love (2020)My Unicorn Girl (2020)Falling into your smile(2022)

Youth (青春）Meteor Shower (2009)One and a Half Summer (2014)Addicted (2016)With You (2016)Love O2O (2016)Operation Love (2017)Rush to the Dead Summer (2017)A Love So Beautiful (2017)My Huckleberry Friends (2017)I Won't Get Bullied by Girls (2018)Meteor Garden (2018)Sweet Combat (2018)The Brightest Star in the Sky (2019)Put Your Head on My Shoulder (2019)Le Coup de Foudre (2019)Go Go Squid! (2019)Another Me (2019)Unrequited Love (2019)A little reunion (2019)Secret in the lattice(2021)
When we were young (2021)

Workplace (职场)Ad Mania (2013)The Interpreter (2016) Surgeons (2017)Game of Hunting (2017)Negotiator (2018)In Youth (2018)Our Glamorous Time (2018)In Youth (2019) 

Period drama (年代剧)
Drama (戏剧)A Leaf in the Storm (2003) The Spring River Flows East (2005) Moment in Peking (2005) Soldiers Sortie (2006) Shanghai Bund (2007)The Road We Have Taken (2009)In That Distance Place (2009)Love in Sun Moon Lake (2009)My Chief and My Regiment (2009)Moment in Peking (2014)Red Sorghum (2014)White Deer Plain (2017)Great Expectations (2018)Flesh and Spirit (2018) Entering a New Era (2018) Like a Flowing River (2018)Winter Begonia (2019)The Little Nyonya (2020)Forward Forever (2020)

Fantasy (玄幻)Wu Xin: The Monster Killer (2015)Guardian (2018)The Eight (2020)Love and Redemption Romance (言情)A Romance in Shanghai (1996) Love Is Payable (1997) Romance in the Rain (2001)The Story of a Noble Family (2003) Affair of Half a Lifetime (2003) To Live to Love (2006) Love at First Fight (2007)The Epic of a Woman (2009)Love in a Fallen City (2009)Entangling Love in Shanghai (2010)Too Late to Say I Love You (2010)Lady & Liar (2015)Legend of Fragrance (2015)Cruel Romance (2015)Destined to Love You (2015)Siege in Fog (2018)Arsenal Military Academy (2019)Love in a Fallen City (2019)

Spy (谍战) / War (谍战)Drawing Sword (2005) Lurk (2009)Tian Xing Jian (2011)Jue Ze (2012)Arrows In A Bowstring (2013)Battle of Changsha (2014)Lost In 1949 (2014)The Disguiser (2015)Decoded (2016)Sparrow (2016)Rookie Agent Rouge (2016)Spy Hunter (2019)Autumn Cicada (2020)

Suspense (悬疑)Tientsin Mystic (2017) The Chronicles of Town Called Jian (2018)Please Give Me a Pair of Wings (2019)My Roommate Is A Detective (2020)

Ancient dramas (古装剧)
Historical
Biographical / Documentary (传记)Towards the Republic (2003)Qiao's Grand Courtyard (2006) The Legend of Bruce Lee (2008)Ren Bishi (2008)Taiwan 1895 (2008) Huo Yuanjia (2008)1911 (2011)Ip Man (2013)Mao Zedong (2013)Deng Xiaoping at History's Crossroads (2014)My Uncle Zhou Enlai (2016)Marshal Peng Dehuai (2016)

Historical (历史)

Involves retelling of historical events.Zhuge Liang (1985)Tang Ming Huang (1990)Romance of the Three Kingdoms (1994)Wu Zetian (1995)Han Liu Bang (1998)Shangguan Wan'er (1998) Records of Kangxi's Travel Incognito (1998)Yongzheng Dynasty (1999) Palace of Desire (2000) Sun Zi Bing Fa Yu San Shi Liu Ji (2000) The Taiping Heavenly Kingdom (2000)Qin Shihuang (2001) Kangxi Dynasty (2001)Qianlong Dynasty (2002)Xiaozhuang Mishi (2003)The Affaire in the Swing Age (2003)The Story of Han Dynasty (2003)Lady Wu: The First Empress (2003)Huang Taizi Mishi (2004)Changping of the War (2004) Genghis Khan (2004) The Legend of Guan Gong (2004) Taizu Mishi (2005)The Emperor in Han Dynasty (2005) Chuanqi Huangdi Zhu Yuanzhang (2006)Wu Zi Bei Ge (2006)Founding Emperor of Ming Dynasty (2006)Initiating Prosperity (2006)The Great Dunhuang (2006)Princess Der Ling (2006)The Rebirth of a King (2006)The Rise of the Tang Empire (2006)Secret History of Kangxi (2006)The Great Revival (2007)Ming Dynasty (2007)Ming Dynasty in 1566 (2007) Carol of Zhenguan (2007)Dongfang Shuo (2008)The Qin Empire (2009)Zheng He Xia Xiyang (2009)Bing Sheng (2009)Three Kingdoms (2010)The Han Triumph (2010)Huang Yanpei (2010)The Legend of Yang Guifei (2010)A Weaver on the Horizon (2010)The Dream of Red Mansions (2010)Secret History of Empress Wu (2011)The Qin Empire II: Alliance (2012)Chu Han Zhengxiong (2012) Heroes of Sui and Tang Dynasties (2012)Su Dongpo (2012)King's War (2012)Love Amongst War (2012)Nos Annees Francaises (2012)Heroes in Sui and Tang Dynasties (2013)Women of the Tang Dynasty (2013)The Legend of Kublai Khan (2013)Heroes of Sui and Tang Dynasties (2014)Cao Cao (2014) The Great Emperor in Song Dynasty (2015)The Advisors Alliance (2017)The Qin Empire III (2017)Secret of the Three Kingdoms (2018)

Costume
Comedy (喜剧)My Fair Princess (1998)Sunny Piggy (2000) Li Wei the Magistrate (2001) The Eloquent Ji Xiaolan (2002) Love Through Different Times (2002)My Fair Princess III (2003)Ma Dashuai (2004) Li Wei Resigns from Office (2005)The Lucky Stars (2005) The Legend of Crazy Monk (2010)Happy Mother-in-Law, Pretty Daughter-in-Law (2011)Unruly Qiao (2011)New My Fair Princess (2011)Go Princess Go (2015)My Amazing Bride (2015)Let's Shake It (2017)The Eternal Love (2017)Oh My General (2017)Mengfei Comes Across (2018)The Sleuth Of Ming Dynasty (2019)The Romance of Hua Rong (2019)The Romance of Tiger and Rose (2020)Oops The King Is In Love (2020)For Married Doctress (2020)

Gong'an (公案)The Three Heroes and Five Gallants (1991) Amazing Detective Di Renjie (2004) Amazing Detective Di Renjie 2 (2006) Amazing Detective Di Renjie 3 (2008)Justice Bao (2008)Justice Bao (2010)Mad Detective Di Renjie (2010)Da Tang Nü Xun An (2011)Young Sherlock (2014)The Three Heroes and Five Gallants (2016)Maiden Holmes (2020)

Fantasy (玄幻)

Involves fictional characters set in a fictional universe.Novoland: The Castle in the Sky (2016)Ice Fantasy (2016)A Life Time Love (2017)Lost Love in Times (2017)Tribes and Empires: Storm of Prophecy (2017)Legend of Fuyao (2018)The King of Blaze (2018)Ever Night (2018)L.O.R.D. Critical World (2019)Novoland: Eagle Flag (2019)

Historical fiction (古偶)

Involves actual historical characters in a fictional narrative. The Prince of Han Dynasty (2001)Huo Yunjia (2001) Love Legend of the Tang Dynasty (2001)Jingwu Yingxiong Chen Zhen (2001)Jiangshan Weizhong (2002) The Young Wong Fei Hung (2002) Hero During Yongle Period (2003) High Flying Songs of Tang Dynasty (2003)Assassinator Jing Ke (2004) How Much Sorrow Do You Have (2005) The Prince of Qin, Li Shimin (2005)Da Qing Fengyun (2006) Da Tang Fu Rong Yuan (2007) The Shadow of Empress Wu (2007) Beauty's Rival in Palace (2010) The Myth (2010) Palace (2011)The Glamorous Imperial Concubine (2011)Beauty World (2011) Scarlet Heart (2011)Empresses in the Palace (2011)Secret History of Princess Taiping (2012)Palace II (2013)Palace 3: The Lost Daughter (2014)Sound of the Desert (2014)Love Yunge from the Desert (2015)Legend of Lu Zhen (2013)Prince of Lan Ling (2013)Hua Mulan (2013)The Patriot Yue Fei (2013)The Empress of China (2014) Legend of Ban Shu (2015)The Legend of Mi Yue (2015) Singing All Along (2016)Chronicle of Life (2016)The Imperial Doctress (2016)Princess Jieyou (2016) God of War, Zhao Yun (2016)The Princess Weiyoung (2016)The Glory of Tang Dynasty (2017)Legend of Dragon Pearl (2017) Rule the World (2017)Song of Phoenix (2017)Nothing Gold Can Stay (2017)Untouchable Lovers (2018)The Legend of Dugu (2018)Story of Yanxi Palace (2018) Ruyi's Royal Love in the Palace (2018)The Legend of Haolan (2019) Queen Dugu (2019)Chong Er's Preach (2019) The Longest Day in Chang'an (2019)Empress of the Ming (2019)The Wolf (2020)Held in the Lonely Castle (2020)Ode to Daughter of Great Tang (2020)The Legend of Xiao Chuo (2020)The Song of Glory (2020)The Promise of Chang'An (2020)

Involves fictional characters in actual historical settings. The Grand Mansion Gate (2001) Jin Mao Xiang (2004) The Last Princess (2008)Ancestral Temple (2009) Dali Princess (2009) Perfect Couple (2014)Nirvana in Fire (2015)General and I (2017)Princess Agents (2017) The King's Woman (2017)Nirvana in Fire 2 (2017)Legend of Yunxi (2018) The Rise of Phoenixes (2018)The Story of Minglan (2018)Goodbye My Princess (2019)I Will Never Let You Go (2019)Princess Silver (2019)Legend of the Phoenix (2019)Joy of Life (2020)Fake Princess (2020)Happiness Over Two Lifetime (2020)Royal Nirvana (2020)In a Class of Her Own (2020)Love Is All (2020)Miss Truth (2020)

Shenmo (神魔) / Shenhua (神話)Ji Gong (1985) Journey to the West (1986)The Investiture of the Gods (1990) Journey to the West (1996)Journey to the West – Legends of the Monkey King (1999)Eternity: A Chinese Ghost Story (2003) Lotus Lantern (2005)The Fairies of Liaozhai (2007)Butterfly Lovers (2007) The Legend and the Hero (2007) The Legend and the Hero 2 (2009)Prelude of Lotus Lantern (2009)Ancient Legends (2010)Wu Cheng'en and Journey to the West (2010)Journey to the West (2010)Journey to the West (2011)Painted Skin (2011)The Holy Pearl (2011)Ma Zu (2012)The Legend of Chasing Fish (2013)The Investiture of the Gods (2014)Legend of Nine Tails Fox (2016)The Destiny of White Snake (2018)The Legend of White Snake (2019) The Gods (2019)Zhaoge (2020) 

Wuxia (武侠)Outlaws of the Marsh (1983) Dream of the Red Chamber (1987) The Book and the Sword (1994)The Water Margin (1998) Treasure Venture (2000) Legendary Fighter: Yang's Heroine (2001)Laughing in the Wind (2001)Book and Sword, Gratitude and Revenge (2002)Drunken Hero (2002)Ode to Gallantry (2002) Shaolin King of Martial Arts (2002) The Heaven Sword and Dragon Saber (2003)Demi-Gods and Semi-Devils (2003)The Legend of the Condor Heroes (2003) Lian Cheng Jue (2004) Warriors of the Yang Clan (2004)The Dragon Heroes (2005)The Proud Twins (2005) The Royal Swordsmen (2005) Trail of the Everlasting Hero (2005) Lost City in Snow Heaven (2005) The Return of the Condor Heroes (2006)Eight Heroes (2006) Eight Charts (2006)Romance of Red Dust (2006) Seven Swordsmen (2006)The Young Warriors (2006)The Legend of Chu Liuxiang (2007)The Legend of Lu Xiaofeng (2007)Sword Stained with Royal Blood (2007) The Legend of the Condor Heroes (2008)The Book and the Sword (2008)Paladins in Troubled Times (2008)Rose Martial World (2008)Royal Tramp (2008)The Shaolin Warriors (2008)The Heaven Sword and Dragon Saber (2009)The Vigilantes In Masks (2010)The Patriotic Knights (2010)Invincible Knights Errant (2011)Kong Que Ling (2011)Twin of Brothers (2011)All Men Are Brothers (2011)The Bride with White Hair (2012)The Legend of Chu Liuxiang (2012)Romance of the Western Chamber (2013)Demi-Gods and Semi-Devils (2013)Swordsman (2013)Sleek Rat, the Challenger (2013)The Deer and the Cauldron (2014)The Four (2015)Men with Sword (2016)The Legend of the Condor Heroes (2017)The Flame's Daughter (2018)Bloody Romance (2018)Heavenly Sword and Dragon Slaying Sabre (2019) Listening Snow Tower (2019) Under The Power (2019)Sword Dynasty (2019) New Dragon Gate Inn (2019)Legend of Awakening (2020)And The Winner Is Love (2020)Mei Ren Mu Bai Shou (2020)Handsome Siblings (2020)Twisted Fate of Love (2020)

Xianxia (仙侠)Chinese Paladin (2005)Chinese Paladin 3 (2009)Xuan-Yuan Sword: Scar of Sky (2012)Swords of Legends (2014)Legend of Zu Mountain (2015)The Journey of Flower (2015)Chinese Paladin 5 (2016)Noble Aspirations (2016)Eternal Love (2017)Fighter of the Destiny (2017)Xuan-Yuan Sword: Han Cloud (2017)Ashes of Love (2018) Martial Universe (2018)Battle Through the Heavens (2018)The Legends (2019)The Untamed (2019) Love and Destiny (2019) Eternal Love of Dream '' (2020)

See also
List of Chinese animated series

References

 
Shows
China

zh:中国电视剧列表